Glazed is the first studio album by the Canadian rock band Mystery Machine.

Track listing
Lyrics by Luke Rogalsky.  Music by Mystery Machine.
"Shaky Ground" - 3:11
"Everyone's Alright" - 2:58
"Valley Song" - 4:54
"Ride" - 5:10
"Stay High" - 2:37
"Hooked" - 1:39
"Floored" - 3:45
"Hi-Test" - 0:52
"Invitation" - 2:19
"Salty" - 0:57
"Underground" - 4:36
"Broken" - 2:29
"Slack" - 5:05
"Stain Master" - 9:37

1993 debut albums
Mystery Machine (band) albums
Capitol Records albums